The Nusatenggara short-nosed fruit bat (Cynopterus nusatenggara) is a species of megabat within the family Pteropodidae found in Indonesia. It has three subspecies:

C. n. nusatenggara
C. n. sinagai
C. n. wetarensis

References

D.E. Wilson & D.M. Reeder, 2005: Mammal Species of the World: A Taxonomic and Geographic Reference. Third Edition. The Johns Hopkins University Press, Baltimore

Cynopterus
Mammals described in 1991
Taxa named by Darrell Kitchener
Bats of Indonesia